Bjarne Hansen (27 May 1929 – 16 January 2023) was a Norwegian footballer who played as a centre-back.

Hansen spent his entire club career at Vålerenga, where he played 158 matches in the Norwegian top league between 1948 and 1964, scoring one goal. He was a member of the Vålerenga side that finished second in the 1948–49 season, winning the silver medal: the club's first-ever league medal. At the time of his death, Hansen was the last surviving member of that team. He also played three times for the Norway national team in 1957 and 1958.

References

External links
 
 

1929 births
2023 deaths
Footballers from Oslo
Norwegian footballers
Association football central defenders
Norway international footballers
Eliteserien players
Vålerenga Fotball players